Champvans may refer to:

Champvans, Jura, a commune in the French region of Franche-Comté
Champvans, Haute-Saône, a commune in the French region of Franche-Comté
Champvans-les-Moulins, a commune in the department of Doubs